Jacob Miller may refer to:

Jacob W. Miller (1800–1862), American politician
Jacob Miller Campbell (1821–1888), American soldier and politician
Jacob Henry Miller (1865–1920), American lawyer and politician
Jacob Miller (musician) (1952–1980), Jamaican reggae artist
Jacob Miller (fl. 2001–2006), American musician in duo Nemesis
Jacob Miller (rugby league) (born 1992), Australian rugby league footballer
Jacob Miller (baseball) (born 2003), American baseball player

See also
Jacob Miller House, in Petoskey, Michigan
Jake Miller (disambiguation)
Jakob Miller (1550–1597), German theologian